Damba Zodbich Zhalsarayev (5 December 1925 – 21 January 2002) was a Soviet and Buryat poet who wrote the Buryat lyrics for the Anthem of the Republic of Buryatia. He was a member of the Union of Soviet Writers.

Early life
When he was a child he worked on farms with his family. He was a student of the Transbaikal military infantry school in 1943 and served in the Second World War at a very young age. He fought against the Kwantung Army. After the war, he served 6 years in the border detachment of Kyakhtinsky District and was discharged in 1952. He was ranked as a Major.

References

1925 births
2002 deaths
Recipients of the Medal of Zhukov
Recipients of the Order "For Merit to the Fatherland", 4th class
Recipients of the Order of Friendship of Peoples
Recipients of the Order of the Red Banner of Labour
Buryat people
National anthem writers
Soviet male poets